Judy Budnitz (born 1973) is an American writer. She grew up in Atlanta, Georgia, attended Harvard University, was a fellow at Provincetown Fine Arts Work Center, and in 1998 received an MFA in creative writing from New York University.

Bibliography

Novels
If I Told You Once (1999)

Collections
Flying Leap (1998)
Nice Big American Baby (2005)

Anthologies containing stories by Judy Budnitz
The Year's Best Fantasy and Horror Twelfth Annual Collection (1999)
"The Better of McSweeney's Volume One -  Issues 1 -10" (2005)
 " The Best American Non Required Reading" (2006)

Awards
1995 Rona Jaffe Foundation Writers' Award
Shortlisted for the 2000 Orange Prize (If I Told You Once)
2000 Edward Lewis Wallant Award
2005 Lannan Literary Fellowship

References

20th-century American novelists
American women novelists
1973 births
Living people
New York University alumni
The Harvard Lampoon alumni
20th-century American women writers
Rona Jaffe Foundation Writers' Award winners
21st-century American novelists
21st-century American women